Yellareddy Assembly constituency is a constituency of Telangana Legislative Assembly, India. It is one of 9 constituencies in Nizamabad district. It is part of Zahirabad Lok Sabha constituency.

Jajala Surender of Telangana Rashtra Samithi represents the constituency for the third term.

Mandals
The Assembly Constituency presently comprises the following Mandals:

Members of Legislative Assembly

Election results

Telangana Legislative Assembly election, 2018

See also
 List of constituencies of Telangana Legislative Assembly

References

Assembly constituencies of Telangana
Nizamabad district